Atal Bihari Vajpayee Stadium or Nadaun Stadium or Amtar Ground is a cricket stadium in Nadaun, Himachal Pradesh, India.  The ground first held a List A match in January 2005 when Himachal Pradesh played the Services in the 2004/05 Ranji Trophy one-day competition.

The ground has held four List A matches, the last of which came in the same competition and saw Haryana played Jammu and Kashmir, though the match itself was abandoned without a ball bowled due to rain.

References

External links
Amtar Ground at ESPNcricinfo
Amtar Ground at CricketArchive

Cricket grounds in Himachal Pradesh
Buildings and structures in Hamirpur district, Himachal Pradesh
Sports venues completed in 2004
2004 establishments in Himachal Pradesh
Memorials to Atal Bihari Vajpayee